Arbat may refer to:

Places

Iran 
Arbat, Charuymaq, a village in East Azerbaijan Province
Arbat, Meyaneh, a village in East Azerbaijan Province
Arbat, Osku, a village in East Azerbaijan Province
Arbat, Qazvin, a village in Qazvin Province
Arbat-e Olya, a village in West Azerbaijan Province
Arbat-e Sofla, a village in West Azerbaijan Province
Arbat, Zanjan, a village in Zanjan Province

Kazakhstan 

 Arbat (Almaty), a pedestrian zone in Almaty
 Arbat (Shymkent), a pedestrian zone in Shymkent

Russia
Arbat District, an administrative district in central Moscow
Arbat Street, a pedestrian street in Moscow
Arbat Gates Square, part of Arbatskaya Square in Moscow
New Arbat Avenue, a central avenue in Moscow, known for many parade routes

Other places
Arbat, Armenia, a village
Arbatan, Nakhchivan or Arbat, Azerbaijan

Other
Children of the Arbat, a 1987 novel by Anatoli Rybakov
Arbat-Elivat-Estoni, a character from the 2000 Animorphs novel The Arrival

See also
Arbatan (disambiguation)
Arbatsky (disambiguation)